Saint-Étienne-de-Beauharnois is a municipality of Quebec, Canada, located within the Beauharnois-Salaberry Regional County Municipality in the Montérégie administrative region. The population as of the Canada 2021 Census was 1,099.

Demographics

Population

Language

Education
Centre de services scolaire de la Vallée-des-Tisserands operates Francophone public schools:
 École Saint-Étienne

New Frontiers School Board operates Anglophone public schools:
 Howick Elementary School in Howick
 Chateauguay Valley Regional High School in Ormstown

See also
 Beauharnois-Salaberry Regional County Municipality
 Saint-Louis River (Beauharnois)
 List of municipalities in Quebec

References

External links

Saint-Étienne-de-Beauharnois official website

Municipalities in Quebec
Incorporated places in Beauharnois-Salaberry Regional County Municipality